Catfish Bend Casino is a casino located in Burlington, Iowa. It is part of the PZAZZ! Entertainment Complex owned by Great River Entertainment.

History
The casino began as a riverboat casino on November 16, 1994 and moved onto land in 2007, once Iowa no longer required casinos to be on navigable waterways.

Property information
The casino includes slot machines, table games, and a sports book. The casino is open 10am to 12am on weekdays and 10am to 2am hours a day on weekends. Due to covid-19.

There are two hotels within the complex, the PZAZZ! Resort Hotel and the Catfish Bend Inn & Spa. There are a number of restaurants on the property, as well as an entertainment complex known as FunCity. There is also an indoor/outdoor water park known as Huck's Harbor.

See also
List of casinos in Iowa

References

External links

Casinos in Iowa
1994 establishments in Iowa
Casinos completed in 1994
Burlington, Iowa micropolitan area